Universal Small Souljah is the fourth album from rapper Bushwick Bill.

Track listing
Intro 
Sex on the Floor 
U Gonna Be My Bitch 
Money & Love 
That's Life
Money Make Me Cum 
Bushmotherfuckingwick 
Like What 
When the Nite Falls 
Dr. Wolfs Gang 
Modern Day Play 
Coming With That Shit 
Cause I'm Here 
Groupie Bitches 
Make Love U & I 
Unforgiven
Outro

2001 albums
Bushwick Bill albums